Saul ( 1114 –1131) was the heir presumptive of the Kingdom of Hungary from around 1127. He was the son of Sophia, the only sister of Stephen II of Hungary. His childless uncle appointed Saul his heir in 1127. Although Saul survived his uncle, according to a late source, he did not succeed him and died before Béla II of Hungary was crowned king in April 1131.

Life
Saul was the only known son of Sophia, the daughter of Coloman the Learned, King of Hungary. The name and family of Saul's father is unknown. Historian Márta Font writes that Saul was born between 1113 and 1115.

According to the Illuminated Chronicle King Stephen II of Hungary, who was childless and delicate of health, "so ordered the succession to the throne that after his death the son of his sister Sophia, by name Saul, should reign." Historian Ferenc Makk says that Saul was appointed heir in the first half of 1127. The Illuminated Chronicle does not contain any further information of Saul's life, but a later sourcethe Ottoman Turkish chronicle known as Tarih-i Üngürüs or The History of the Hungarianswrites that he survived his uncle who died in the spring 1131. According to the latter source, Béla II, Stephen II's cousin, was only crowned king, on 28 April 1131, after Saul's death on an unspecified date.

References

Sources

The Hungarian Illuminated Chronicle: Chronica de Gestis Hungarorum (Edited by Dezső Dercsényi) (1970). Corvina, Taplinger Publishing. .

1110s births
1131 deaths
Hungarian nobility
House of Árpád
Pretenders to the Hungarian throne
12th-century Hungarian people